Pangaea was a supercontinent of ancient Earth.

Pangaea or Pangea may also refer to:

 Pangaea Ultima, possible future global supercontinent
 Pangea (cable system), a submarine telecommunications cable system connecting the Netherlands and Denmark to the UK 	 
 Pangea Software, a software company focusing on Apple iOS games
 Pangea Recordings, a record label
 Pangaea (mountain), a mountain in Greek mythology, involved in the war between the Titans and the Greek gods
 Pangaea (album), a 1975 album by Miles Davis
 Pangea Day, a 2008 international multimedia event
 PangaeaPanga (born 1996), Super Mario World speedrunner and hacker
 Pangaea (band), an Australian punk/metal band
 PANGAEA (data library), a publisher and archive for data from earth system research
 Pangaea (sculpture), a 1997 public art by Michaela Mahady at the University of Wisconsin–Milwaukee
 Pangea Corporation, an animation and toy industry company
 Pangea Resources, a company notable for a controversial proposal for an international radioactive waste repository in Australia

See also
ESA PANGAEA, an astronaut training program